The first season of the anime show Yu-Gi-Oh! 5D's consists of 26 episodes, and follows Yusei Fudo as he escapes from Satellite, and learns about his destiny as a Signer. The season uses two pieces of theme music; the opening theme is 'Kizuna' by Kra whilst the ending theme is 'Start' by Masataka Nakagauchi. It is known as the Signers Arc in Japan, and the Fortune Cup Duels in the US. It is the first Yu-Gi-Oh! series to be produced in 16:9 widescreen, although it was letterboxed in the United States broadcast.

Episode list

References

2008 Japanese television seasons
5D's (season 1)